Korina may refer to:

 Korina language, an Arauan language of Brazil and Peru
 An alternative name of several other languages: see Culina language (disambiguation)
 Korina people, indigenous people of Brazil and Peru
 Korina Adamou (born 2002), Cypriot footballer
 Korina Legaki, Greek singer
 Korina Perkovac (born 1999), Swiss volleyball player
 Korina Perkovic (born 1987), German former tennis player
 Korina Sanchez (born 1964), Filipino journalist
 Terminalia superba, a large tree native to tropical western Africa, known as Korina in the US

See also
 Corina (disambiguation)
 Korin (disambiguation)
 Korine
 Korinna